Vladimír Šťastný (17 March 1841 Rudíkov, Margraviate of Moravia – 20 August 1910 Obřany, Margraviate of Moravia) was a Moravian priest and poet. He is also known under the pseudonym Josef Ruda. After studying theology, he was chaplain in Židlochovice and a prefect at the Brno bishop seminary. After that he taught at the 1st Czech Gymnasium in Brno. He was the founder of the magazine Obzor (Horizon) and the chief executive of the Literature association of the heritage of Saint Cyril and Metoděj.

Works 
 Kvítí májové (May Flowers)-1869
 Kytka z Moravy (A Flower from Moravia)-1879
 Drobné květy (Small Flowers)-1887
 Hlasy a ohlasy (Voices and echoes) -1892
 Hory a doly (Mountains and Mines)-1894

References 

1841 births
1910 deaths
Czech poets
Czech male poets